Blis-et-Born is a former commune in the Dordogne department in southwestern France. On 1 January 2017, it was merged into the new commune Bassillac et Auberoche.

Population

See also
Communes of the Dordogne département

References

Former communes of Dordogne